John Mains (1851–1901) was an Irish nationalist politician and Member of Parliament (MP) in the House of Commons of the United Kingdom of Great Britain and Ireland.

He was elected as an Irish National Federation (Anti-Parnellite) MP for the North Donegal constituency at the 1892 general election. He did not contest the 1895 general election.

External links

1851 births
1901 deaths
Anti-Parnellite MPs
Members of the Parliament of the United Kingdom for County Donegal constituencies (1801–1922)
UK MPs 1892–1895